William Henry Nolan (4 November 1926 – 14 August 2002) was an Australian rules footballer who played with Collingwood in the Victorian Football League (VFL). He was originally from Northcote and returned to the club after his time at Collingwood.

Nolan later played at Daylesford (Ballarat Football League) and coached Kyneton (Bendigo Football League), and he lived in Kyneton after his football career.

Notes

External links 

Bill Nolan's playing statistics from The VFA Project
Profile from Collingwood Forever

1927 births
2002 deaths
Australian rules footballers from Victoria (Australia)
Collingwood Football Club players
Northcote Football Club players